Chamarea is a genus of flowering plant in the Apiaceae, with 5 species. It is found in southern Africa.

References 

Apioideae